Ben Schechter (born August 26, 1980) is an American artist and filmmaker best known as a partner in Directors Collective Weird Days. He is now based in Los Angeles.

Career

Ben Schechter established Weird Days with Alex Goldberg and Drew Blatman in 2007. They gained notoriety for their work with Riff Raff, Santigold, Das Racist, Tanlines. and Real Estate. Schechter has directed commercials for MySpace, Nike, Converse, and Levi's.

Make It Rain

Schechter is the co-creator of "Make It Rain: For the Love of Money." The app was #1 in the iTunes store and has over 50 million downloads.

Ben's Books 
Schechter ran a small independent book store in Williamsburg, Brooklyn. It has since closed.

References

External links 
 Weird Days

American music video directors
Living people
1980 births
Place of birth missing (living people)
American digital artists
New media artists